The following is a list of notable people who were either born/raised or have lived for a significant period of time in the city of Port Harcourt, Rivers State, Nigeria.

A
George Abbey (born 1978), soccer player
Precious Achiuwa, basketball player for the Toronto Raptors
Echendu Adiele (born 1978), soccer player
Friday Ahunanya (born 1971), boxer
Claude Ake (1939–1996), political scientist
Mercy Akide (born 1975), former soccer player
Diezani Alison-Madueke (born 1960), former minister of Petroleum Resources
Mactabene Amachree (born 1978), basketball player
Chibuike Amaechi (born 1965), former governor of Rivers State
Thankgod Amaefule (born 1984), soccer player
Mark Angel (born 1991), video producer
Napoleon Ashley-Lassen (born 1934), Chief of the Defence Staff of the Ghana Armed Forces
Izu Azuka (born 1989), soccer player
Ajuri Ngelale, Senior Special Assistant to President Muhammadu Buhari on public affairs

B
A. Igoni Barrett (born 1979), writer
Andre Blaze (born 1983), rapper, reality talent show host
Nimi Briggs (born 1944), Vice-Chancellor of the University of Port Harcourt
Burna Boy (born 1991), singer, songwriter

C
Monalisa Chinda, actress
Mercy Chinwo, singer, actress
Chinonye Chukwu, writer, director
Tonye Cole (born 1967), businessman

D
Agbani Darego (born 1982), model; first Black African Miss World
George Datoru (born 1978), soccer player
Tonto Dikeh, actress and singer
Duncan Dokiwari (born 1973), boxer
Eddy Lord Dombraye (born 1979), soccer player
David Ibiyeomie  (born), Preacher

E
Ngozi Ebere (born 1991), soccer player
Emmanuel Ebiede (born 1978), soccer player
Obinna Ekezie (born 1975), basketball player
Emmanuella (born 2010), comedian
Tamara Eteimo (born 1987), actress and singer
Dino Eze (born 1984), soccer player
Sandra Ezekwesili (born 1989), radio personality
Ehie Ogerenye Edison (born 1984), Nigerian Politician

F
Ibinabo Fiberesima (born 1973), actress
Samuel Francis (born 1987), athlete

G
Muma Gee (born 1978), singer and actress
Finidi George (born 1971), retired soccer player
Odeni George (born 1995), soccer player
Bikiya Graham-Douglas (born 1983), actress and businesswoman

Mark Ukelabuchi Ideozu, Registered Engineer and Lecturer
Christian Ibeagha (born 1990), soccer player
Tonye Irims (born 1970), Entrepreneur
John Ibeh (born 1986), soccer player
Tonye Ibiama (born 1974), businessman
Bernie Ibini-Isei (born 1992), soccer player
Faith Ikidi (born 1987), soccer player
Manasseh Ishiaku (born 1983), soccer player

J
Nasigba John-Jumbo (born 1988), soccer player
Patience Jonathan (born 1957), former First Lady of Nigeria

K
Ignatius Kattey (born 1948), archbishop

L
Obafemi Lasode (born 1955), actor

M
 

M-Trill (born 1979), rapper
Davis Mac-Iyalla (born 1972), LGBT activist
Chiamaka Madu (born 1996), soccer player
Prince Eze Madumere (born 1964), former Deputy Governor, Imo State 
Maud Meyer, jazz singer
Duncan Mighty (born 1983), singer, record producer
Oliver Mobisson (1943 – 2010), activist
Mr 2kay, singer
Mr Eazi, singer
Muna, hip hop artist and pageant winner

N
Martin Newland (born 1961), journalist and executive director
Peter Nieketien (born 1968), former soccer player
Chimaroke Nnamani (born 1960), politician
Ike Nwachukwu (born 1940), politician
Chidi Nwanu (born 1967), soccer player
David Nwolokor (born 1996), soccer player
Benji Nzeakor (born 1964), retired soccer player
Priscilla Nzimiro (1923–1951), physician

O
Saint Obi, actor
Chidi Odiah (born 1983), soccer player
Mary Odili (born 1952), Associate Justice of the Supreme Court of Nigeria
Peter Odili (born 1948), Governor of Rivers State 
Walter Ofonagoro (born 1940), scholar, businessman
Great Ogboru, businessman and politician
Timothy Ogene, writer
Chinelo Okparanta, writer
Aaron Samuel Olanare (born 1994), soccer player
Adokiye Oyagiri (born 1985), Political Activist and farmer
Elkanah Onyeali, soccer player
Daniel Onyekachi (born 1985), soccer player
Darlington Onyeri (born 1977), businessman
Yvonne Orji (born 1983), actress
Richard Daddy Owubokiri (born 1961), retired soccer player
Ukel Oyaghiri (born 1964), Lawyer, Politician
Omah Lay, Musician

P
Prince Tonye Princewill (born 1969), businessman and politician

S
Emmanuella Samuel, YouTube child comedian, best known for appearing in MarkAngelComedy videos
Zina Saro-Wiwa, video artist and filmmaker
Jesse Sekidika (born 1996), soccer player
Uchechi Sunday (born 1994), soccer player

T
Marco Tagbajumi (born 1988), soccer player
Cleopatra Tawo, radio personality
Elsie Nwanwuri Thompson, lawyer
Timaya (born 1977), singer
Nwankwo Tochukwu (born 1986), soccer player
Hector Tubonemi (born 1988), soccer player

U
Colin Udoh, journalist and sports television presenter
 Mary Uranta, actress and businesswoman

W
Waconzy, singer, songwriter
Adewale Wahab (born 1984), soccer player
Taribo West (born 1974), soccer player
Kay Williamson (1935–2005), linguist

Y
Albert Yobo (born 1979), soccer player
Joseph Yobo (born 1980), soccer player

See also

List of people from Rivers State

References

External links

 
People
Lists of people by city
Lists of people from Rivers State